Krekor Ohanian (August 15, 1925 – January 26, 2017), known professionally as Mike Connors, was an American actor best known for playing private detective Joe Mannix in the CBS television series Mannix from 1967 to 1975, a role which earned him a Golden Globe Award in 1970, the first of six straight nominations, as well as four consecutive Emmy nominations from 1970 to 1973. He starred in the short-lived series Tightrope! (1959–1960) and Today's FBI (1981–1982). Connors' acting career spanned six decades. In addition to his work on television, he appeared in numerous films, including Sudden Fear (1952), Good Neighbor Sam (1964), Situation Hopeless... But Not Serious (1965), Stagecoach (1966), Kiss the Girls and Make Them Die (1966), and Too Scared to Scream (1985), which he also produced.

Early life
Connors was born Krekor Ohanian, Jr., on August 15, 1925, in Fresno, California, to Armenian parents Krekor and Alice (née Surabian) Ohanian. They married in 1915 and had six children: Paul I, Paul II, Dorothy M., Arpesri A., Krekor, and Eugene. His father was an attorney and represented many Armenians who had little money and could not speak English. Connors spoke three languages: Armenian, English, and French. Connors was a cousin of French-Armenian singer Charles Aznavour.

Connors was an avid basketball player in high school, nicknamed "Touch" by his teammates. During World War II, he served as an enlisted man in the United States Army Air Forces. After the war, he attended the University of California at Los Angeles on both a basketball scholarship and the G.I. Bill, where he played under coach John Wooden. Connors went to law school, where he studied to become an attorney, taking after his father. He was a member of the Phi Delta Theta fraternity. 

After a basketball game, coach Wilbur Johns introduced Connors to his friend, director William A. Wellman, who liked Connors' voice and expressive face while he was playing basketball, and encouraged him to consider acting. He was considered for the role of Tarzan by casting director Ruth Burch, who found him an acting coach.

After Connors became an actor, his agent Henry Willson thought the name "Ohanian" was too similar to the actor George O'Hanlon and gave him the stage name "Touch Connors" based on his basketball nickname. Willson considered "Connors" to be a "good all-American name." Connors later stated he hated the name "from day one" and considered not using his real name the only big regret of his career. After getting the starring role in Tightrope!, Connors wanted to be credited as Ohanian, but Columbia Pictures told him that he had already done too much work as Connors, though he was allowed to change his first name to Mike.

Career

Early roles

Connors's film career started in the early 1950s, when he made his acting debut in a supporting role opposite Joan Crawford and Jack Palance in the thriller Sudden Fear (1952). He had initially been rejected for an audition by producer Joseph Kaufman due to his lack of experience, but after sneaking into Republic Pictures and meeting director David Miller, Connors was given a chance to read the script and was offered the part.

Connors was cast in the John Wayne film, Island in the Sky in which he played a crewman on one of the search-and-rescue planes. In 1956, he played an Amalekite herder in Cecil B. DeMille's The Ten Commandments.

Connors appeared in numerous television series, including the co-starring role in the 1955 episode "Tomas and the Widow" of the anthology series Frontier. He guest-starred on the early sitcoms, Hey, Jeannie! and The People's Choice and in two Rod Cameron syndicated crime dramas, City Detective and the Western-themed State Trooper, and played the villain in the first episode filmed (but second one aired) of ABC's smash hit Maverick, opposite James Garner in 1957.

Connors had roles in several of the earliest films Roger Corman directed: Five Guns West (1955), The Day the World Ended (1955), Swamp Women (1956), and The Oklahoma Woman (1956). Connors starred in and was the executive producer of Flesh and the Spur (1956). He raised $117,000 for the film.

In 1958, Connors appeared in the title role of the episode "Simon Pitt", the series finale of the NBC Western Jefferson Drum, starring Jeff Richards as a frontier newspaper editor. He appeared in another NBC Western series, The Californians. That same year, Connors was cast as Miles Borden, a corrupt US Army lieutenant bitter over his $54 monthly pay, on NBC's Wagon Train in the episode "The Dora Gray Story" with Linda Darnell in the title role. About this time, he also appeared on an episode of NBC's Western series Cimarron City.

Other syndicated series in which he appeared were The Silent Service, based on true stories of the submarine section of the United States Navy; Sheriff of Cochise, a Western series; Whirlybirds, an aviation adventure series; and Rescue 8, based on stories of the Los Angeles County Fire Department. An episode of Studio 57 starring Connors and titled "Getaway Car" was proposed as a pilot for a series about the CHP to be called Motorcycle Cop.

Connors starred as an undercover police officer who infiltrated organized crime in Tightrope! (1959–1960). Despite the show's popularity, it was cancelled after only one season. Connors stated in an interview that the show's primary sponsor, J.B. Williams, refused CBS president James Aubrey's request to move it to a later time slot on a different day. The sponsor dropped Tightrope! and underwrote another program on another network. Connors also did not agree with the suggested change to add a sidekick, to be played by Don Sullivan. He thought the program would lose the suspense element, "Because the whole premise was this guy, all by himself, 'on a tightrope.' ... When he gets a sidekick, it loses the threat and the danger, and the whole premise is in the toilet."

Later, he was cast in the episode "The Aerialist" of the anthology series, Alcoa Presents: One Step Beyond. In 1963, he guest-starred as Jack Marson in the episode "Shadow of the Cougar" on the NBC modern Western series, Redigo, starring Richard Egan. In 1964, Connors appeared in a pinch-hit role for Raymond Burr as attorney Joe Kelly in the Perry Mason episode, "The Case of the Bullied Bowler." Connors was invited to take on a lead role in the series on an ongoing basis, but the producers had actually wanted to pressure Burr into resigning his contract with the series.

In 1964, Connors had a role in the Jack Lemmon comedy Good Neighbor Sam and was the leading man to Susan Hayward and Bette Davis in Where Love Has Gone. He co-starred with Robert Redford in one of his earliest film roles, the World War II black comedy Situation Hopeless... But Not Serious (1965), in which Connors and Redford played American soldiers taken prisoner by a German villager played by Alec Guinness. Connors played the card shark in the remake of Stagecoach (1966).

Connors was strongly considered to play Matt Helm in The Silencers (1966), but that role had eventually gone to Dean Martin. However, his audition had impressed Columbia Pictures, so Connors was instead cast in the similar James Bond spoof film Kiss the Girls and Make Them Die (1966). Connors himself performed the stuntwork of dangling from a rope ladder attached to a helicopter flying off the Christ the Redeemer statue in Rio de Janeiro when the local stuntman refused to do it.

Mannix

Connors became best known for playing the private investigator Joe Mannix in the detective series Mannix. The series ran for eight seasons from 1967 to 1975. During the first season of the series, Joe Mannix works for Intertect, a large Los Angeles detective agency run by his superior Lew Wickersham (Joseph Campanella). From the second season onward, Mannix opens his own detective agency and is assisted by his secretary Peggy Fair (Gail Fisher).

Mannix was originally produced by Desilu Productions (later absorbed by Paramount Television). Then-president Lucille Ball pushed for CBS to keep the show on the air by removing the high-tech computers and making Mannix an independent detective. This move enabled the show to become a long-running hit for the network.
Connors performed his own stunts on the series. During the filming of the pilot episode, he broke his wrist and dislocated his shoulder.

Joe Mannix was an Armenian-American, like Connors. He spoke Armenian in a number of episodes and often quoted Armenian proverbs.

In 1970, Connors won the Golden Globe Award for Best Actor in a Television Series Drama. He was nominated for the Golden Globe Award six times from 1970 to 1975 and was nominated for the Primetime Emmy Award for Outstanding Lead Actor in a Drama Series four times from 1970 to 1973.

When discussing the success of the series in an interview, Connors stated: "The show itself started a whole new era of detective shows, because this wasn't the usual cynical private eye à la Humphrey Bogart. It was more a show about an all-round normal human being. The character of Joe Mannix could be taken advantage of by a pretty face, he could shed a tear on an emotional level, he was very close to his father and his family, so he was more a normal personality with normal behavior."

Connors was able to work with his boss Lucille Ball on-screen during a cross-promotion episode of her Here's Lucy series in 1971. The episode, which opened Lucy's fourth season, is titled "Lucy and Mannix are Held Hostage". This was notable as the first episode shot at Universal Studios, after Ball ceased producing her program at Paramount Studios.

Mannix remained a hit show through its final season. The show was taken off the air due to a dispute between CBS and Paramount. Paramount had sold the rights to air Mannix reruns to rival network ABC without informing CBS. When CBS discovered the deal, the executives quickly decided to cancel Mannix to avoid losing viewership for new episodes to the reruns.

He later reprised the role of Joe Mannix in a 1997 episode of Diagnosis: Murder and in the 2003 comedy film Nobody Knows Anything!

Later career

He narrated J. Michael Hagopian's 1975 documentary film The Forgotten Genocide, one of the first full-length features on the Armenian genocide. The documentary was nominated for two Emmys. In 1995, Connors narrated another Armenian documentary by Hagopian, Ararat Beckons.

In 1976, Connors played Karl Ohanian in the television film The Killer Who Wouldn't Die. Producers and writers Ivan Goff and Ben Roberts, who were also producers for Mannix, wanted the character to have Connors' real last name. The film was intended to be the pilot for a new ABC series titled Ohanian, about an Armenian-American former homicide detective who is now a charter-boat skipper. However, the series was not picked up.

Connors had roles in the thriller films Avalanche Express (1979) and Nightkill (1980). He starred as a bureau veteran who mentors a team of agents in Today's FBI (1981–1982). The series only lasted one season. Connors both starred in and produced the independent horror film Too Scared to Scream (1985).

He played Colonel Harrison "Hack" Peters in the 1988 miniseries War and Remembrance. Connors hosted the 1989 series Crimes of the Century. He voiced the character Chipacles in the Disney animated series Hercules from 1998 to 1999.

Connors' final appearance was in a 2007 Two and a Half Men episode, as a love interest of Evelyn Harper (Holland Taylor).

Personal life
Connors married Mary Lou Willey on September 10, 1949, when they were both UCLA students. They had two children, a son, Matthew Gunnar Ohanian, and a daughter, Dana Lee Connors. Matthew was diagnosed with schizophrenia at age 15. Matthew predeceased his father, dying of heart failure in 2007. Through his daughter Dana, he had one granddaughter.

After his son's diagnosis, Connors became active in charitable organizations for patients diagnosed with mental-disorders. He was a spokesperson for the National Alliance on Mental Illness. In 1998, the UC Irvine College of Medicine's Brain Imaging Center Committee awarded Connors the Silver Ribbon Award for his contributions.

Connors made a public-service announcement for the Armenian Eye Care Project.

Connors was a Republican. He endorsed Ronald Reagan for President in 1980 and 1984 and endorsed George Deukmejian for Governor of California in 1982 and 1986.

Death
Connors died in Tarzana, California, at the age of 91 on January 26, 2017, a week after being diagnosed with leukemia.

Filmography

Film

Television

Awards and nominations

References

Further reading

External links

 
 Mike Connors (Aveleyman)

1925 births
2017 deaths
American male television actors
American male film actors
20th-century American male actors
Male actors from Fresno, California
Male actors from Los Angeles
Armenian male actors
American people of Armenian descent
Best Drama Actor Golden Globe (television) winners
Western (genre) television actors
California Republicans
American men's basketball players
UCLA Bruins men's basketball players
United States Army Air Forces personnel of World War II
United States Army Air Forces soldiers
Military personnel from California
Deaths from leukemia
Deaths from cancer in California